Rana Gurmit Singh Sodhi (born 9 January 1954) is an Indian Politician and a Bharatiya Janata Party Leader in Punjab and a former International Shooter. Sodhi was earlier in Congress Party and has been a Member of the Punjab Legislative Assembly (MLA) from the Guru Har Sahai in Firozpur district of Punjab since 2002.

Political career 
He became a member of the Youth Congress in 1976.

He had been elected to the Punjab Vidhan Sabha in 2002, 2007, 2012 and 2017 consecutively. Prior to this, he also functioned as Chief Whip of the Congress Legislative Party. In April 2018, he was inducted into the Punjab Cabinet as a Cabinet Minister for Sports and Youth Affairs.

Before the 2022 Punjab Legislative Assembly election, Rana Gurmit Singh Sodhi resigned from the Congress Party and joined the BJP in December, 2021. Sodhi was the Sports Minister in the former Punjab chief minister Captain Amarinder Singh's Cabinet, but was excluded from new chief minister Charanjit Singh Channi’s ministry.

Double compensation case 
He is named in the double compensation scams related to land acquired by the government. An inter-departmental committee under the Chief Secretary had in 2020 indicted the minister for taking double compensation for land acquired at Mohan Ke Uttar village in Ferozepur during the previous SAD-BJP government in July 2014. A case for recovery of rupees 1.83 crores is pending in the Supreme Court of India. Cases of double compensation scams related to land acquired by the Government of India (of Rupees 1.83 crores) are pending against him in the Supreme Court of India.

References 

1954 births
Punjab, India politicians
Living people
Punjab, India MLAs 2002–2007
Punjab, India MLAs 2007–2012
Punjab, India MLAs 2012–2017
Punjab, India MLAs 2017–2022
Bharatiya Janata Party politicians from Punjab